WHPY-FM (94.5 MHz) is a radio station licensed to Bellevue, Tennessee, United States.

History
The station began in 1974 as WPCT at 94.3 FM and featured a country music format. WPCT was licensed at the time to Jackson, Tennessee.

The station continued with country music until November 28, 2003, when it was sold to Grace Broadcasting, who flipped formats to Christian Music. In between those times, the station changed its callsign to WIST in 1983 and WFGZ in 1994, before becoming WHPY-FM in 2012.

It was announced on December 13, 2011, that Grace Broadcasting would sell the station to Kensington Digital Media. The sale was finalized on January 3, 2012 as the station would also relocate from broadcasting in Jackson to Nashville and would be licensed to Bellevue, Tennessee, a Nashville neighborhood. At that time, KDM also changed formats to classic hits, branded as "Hippie Radio 94.5", but at present, WHPY-FM broadcasts largely an oldies format, with emphasis on music that received airplay on Top 40/CHR stations from the 1960s through the 1980s.

Notable DJs
Spider Harrison

References

External links

HPY-FM
Perry County, Tennessee
Classic hits radio stations in the United States
Radio stations established in 1974
1974 establishments in Tennessee